State Highway 5 (SH-5 or OK-5) is the name assigned to two distinct state highways in the U.S state of Oklahoma. One runs for  through extreme southwestern Oklahoma, passing through Harmon and Jackson Counties.

Route description

Western section
The western SH-5 begins at U.S. Highway 62 in Gould, Oklahoma and runs south until just past Lincoln, where it turns east. It then ends at State Highway 6 in Eldorado, just seven miles (11 km) north of the Texas border.

The western SH-5 was once known as SH-90.

Both the now-separate western and eastern sections of SH-5 were formerly part of a continuous SH-5 across Southwest Oklahoma. From 1958 to 1969, SH-5 continued east from Eldorado over an unpaved roadway to a junction with US-283 east of Elmer, and then turned north on a route shared with US-283 to the current west terminus of the eastern SH-5 at its junction with US-283 south of Altus and west of Tipton and continued east over the current eastern SH-5. The former Eldorado to Elmer section of SH-5 was removed from the state highway system in 1969 and continues in use as a county road under the jurisdiction of Jackson County.

Eastern section
The eastern SH-5 starts between Altus and Elmer at US-283. It heads east from here to Tipton, where it turn south and SH-5C splits off. South of Tipton, SH-5 turns east again to intersect U.S. Highway 183 in Frederick. 19 miles (30.5 km) later, it has a two-mile (3.2 km) concurrency with State Highway 36. The highway splits off to the east from here, sharing a three-mile (4.8 km) concurrency with US-277/281 and an interchange with Interstate 44 (which is also the Walters toll plaza of the H.E. Bailey Turnpike).

Five miles (8 km) east of where this three-route concurrency breaks up, SH-5 turns south in Walters, with the mainline being taken over by State Highway 53. SH-5 heads east again toward Temple, where it has a brief concurrency with State Highway 65, and then turns southeast to pass through Hastings before ending at US-70 in Waurika.

Spurs
SH-5 has three lettered spur routes.

SH-5A connects SH-5 south of Walters to US-277/281 south of Cookietown.
SH-5B does not connect directly with SH-5. It runs from SH-5A south to US-70 at Taylor. 
SH-5C runs from SH-5 at Tipton to US-183 in Manitou.

Junction list

Western section

Eastern section

References

005
Transportation in Harmon County, Oklahoma
Transportation in Jackson County, Oklahoma
Transportation in Tillman County, Oklahoma
Transportation in Cotton County, Oklahoma
Transportation in Jefferson County, Oklahoma